Zelle is a United States–based digital payments network owned by Early Warning Services, LLC, a private financial services company owned by the banks Bank of America, Truist, Capital One, JPMorgan Chase, PNC Bank, U.S. Bank, and Wells Fargo. The Zelle service enables individuals to electronically transfer money from their bank account to another registered user's bank account (within the United States) using a mobile device or the website of a participating banking institution.

The Zelle instant payment service was launched in June 2017. Previously, the Zelle service was known as clearXchange, which offered payment services through member financial institutions and a website. Launched in April 2011, clearXchange was originally owned by Bank of America, JPMorgan Chase, and Wells Fargo. After Capital One and US Bank joined as partners, clearXchange was sold to Early Warning Services in January 2016. In December 2017, all clearXchange accounts for person-to-person payment services became Zelle accounts.

History 
In April 2011, the clearXchange service was launched. It was originally owned and operated by Bank of America, JPMorgan Chase, and Wells Fargo. The service offered person-to-person (P2P), business-to-consumer (B2C), and government-to-consumer (G2C) payments.

For person-to-person payments, clearXchange enabled users to send money to other registered users having accounts at participating banks in the United States. Users accessed the network within the websites and apps of member financial institutions, and through clearXchange's website. The network connected with existing bank accounts, so consumers would not need to fund a separate account to use the service. This feature and the lack of fees for using the service were highlighted as advantages for competition with other person-to-person payment services such as PayPal, Popmoney, and Square. The system associated each user bank account with an email address and mobile phone number, so only the recipient's email address or mobile number was needed to send money directly from a bank account to the bank account of another person who had signed up for the service.

The number of financial institutions affiliated with clearXchange grew to include other banks and credit unions. Capital One and US Bank were added as additional owner-members.

In June 2015, clearXchange announced the availability of a real-time payment system. Some transactions could take as much as five days or longer to be completed.

In January 2016, clearXchange was sold to Early Warning Services. Early Warning Services is owned by Bank of America, Truist, Capital One, JPMorgan Chase, PNC Bank, US Bank, and Wells Fargo.

In September 2017, Early Warning Services released the Zelle payment system and mobile app and announced that all clearXchange "person-to-person" payment service accounts would be deactivated in December 2017. After that, clearXchange stopped supporting person-to-person payments but has continued to provide payments from companies and government entities to certain customers. The company encouraged the former users of clearXchange to sign up for the new Zelle service. As in the former clearXchange service, payees are identified in the Zelle service by an association between the recipient's bank account and an email address or mobile phone number. Money sent to a registered payee who has an account at a financial institution that is a member of the Zelle network is typically available to the recipient "within minutes".

In March 2019, Early Warning Services's CEO, Paul Finch, stepped down to work with the Finch Family Foundation, a Phoenix, Arizona, nonprofit organization that serves needy families and children. Finch cited his long tenure, the completion of the launch of the Zelle network, and the company's plans to start new projects as reasons for the timing of his departure. 

In May 2019, Early Warning Services appointed their new CEO, Albert Ko, formerly the chief transformation officer for Intuit. While with Intuit, Ko was the general manager for Mint and an overseer of QuickBooks.

The Zelle service 
The Zelle service is intended for payments to those whom the payer already knows and trusts and the service disclaims any responsibility for goods and services sold through the system.

Zelle users can send money to other registered Zelle users. (If they attempt to send money to unregistered recipients, the intended recipient will receive an invitation to sign up for the service to complete the transaction.) Users access the network within the websites and apps of Zelle-participating U.S. financial institutions and through the Zelle mobile app. To register with the Zelle mobile app, users must enroll a supported MasterCard or Visa-branded debit card issued in connection with a U.S. bank account.

The network connects with existing bank accounts, so consumers do not need to fund a separate account to use the service. Only the recipient's email address or mobile number is needed for a user to send money directly from their bank account to the recipient's bank account.

An email address or mobile phone number may only be actively enrolled in Zelle to receive payments at one financial institution. To register at multiple banks, users need to provide different email addresses or mobile phone numbers for each.

A Zelle user can transfer money to a recipient or submit a request for others to send a payment or to split the cost of a payment.

There are limits on the dollar amount and frequency of transactions allowed on Zelle imposed by the banking institution associated with the account being used. For example, transfers from most Wells Fargo funding accounts are limited to $2,500 per day and $20,000 in a 30-day period, and lower limits may apply for new payees or when using the Zelle mobile app rather than the bank's self-operated services. Transfers from a Chase checking account are limited to $2,000 per day and $16,000 per calendar month.

Payments made using Zelle cannot be canceled (unless an attempt was made to send a payment to someone who has not enrolled in the service).

The Zelle website launched in June 2017 says that "Transactions between enrolled Zelle users typically occur in minutes. If your recipient is not yet enrolled with Zelle, it may take between 1 and 3 business days after they enroll."

Competition with PayPal's Venmo service

The Zelle service's principal competitor is PayPal and its Venmo payment service. Venmo is more popular, based on public awareness, opinion polling, and active engagement with users, but Zelle processes a much larger dollar volume of money transfers — reportedly US$75 billion in its first year, 2017.

The two services work very similarly from the user's perspective, e.g., both services use email addresses and mobile phone numbers to identify recipients, but Venmo lacks the direct integration with banking institutions that Zelle has and Zelle money transfers are typically processed more quickly.

Starting in January 2018, Venmo began to offer a more rapid transfer option than its typical 1–3 day transfer service. Venmo charges a fee for the service, whereas Zelle-affiliated banks do not.

The Zelle network does not charge users a fee for money transfers. Banks are allowed to charge a fee for Zelle transfers involving their accounts, but they have generally not chosen to do so.

Both Venmo and Zelle payments to a registered user cannot be canceled, though a customer service rep for the company may be able to reverse the transaction with the permission of the recipient.

Owners 
 Bank of America
 Capital One
 JPMorgan Chase
 PNC Bank
 Truist
 U.S. Bank
 Wells Fargo

Partners
The Zelle Network includes more than 1000 financial institutions, including the network partners MasterCard, Visa, and processor partners such as FIS, Fiserv, and Jack Henry & Associates.

Criticism 
The Zelle service has received adverse publicity for fraud incidents in which bank customers' accounts were compromised through social engineering and Zelle then set up by the fraudsters and used to transfer funds out of the victims' accounts, leaving victims with little practical or legal recourse. In some cases, bank customers have been compensated by the banks involved, depending upon the bank and its policies and the specifics of the incident. Banks may use secondary confirmation methods such as SMS or otherwise place limits on newly created accounts and transfers to recently added recipients as a preventive measure. Shortly before releasing a critical report, Senator Elizabeth Warren berated Zelle executives at a September, 2022, Senate Banking Committee hearing, both for lack of refunds in cases of fraud, and lack of response to requests for statistics.

See also 
 Unified Payments Interface

References

External links 
 

Payment systems
Mobile payments
Payment service providers
Financial services companies established in 2017
2017 establishments in Arizona
Payment networks
Online payments